The politics of Hebei Province in the People's Republic of China is structured in a dual party-government system like all other governing institutions in mainland China.

The Governor of Hebei is the highest-ranking official in the People's Government of Hebei. However, in the province's dual party-government governing system, the Governor has less power than the Hebei Chinese Communist Party (CCP) Provincial Committee Secretary.

Secretaries of the CCP Hebei Committee
Lin Tie: July 12, 1949－August 25, 1966
Liu Zihou: August 25, 1966－February 3, 1968
Li Xuefeng: February 3, 1968－January 26, 1971
Liu Zihou: January 26, 1971－December 26, 1979
Jin Ming: December 26, 1979－June 16, 1982
Gao Yang: June 6, 1982－May 28, 1985
Xing Chongzhi: May 29, 1985－January 27, 1993
Cheng Weigao: January 27, 1993－October 8, 1998
Ye Liansong: October 8, 1998－June 30, 2000
Wang Xudong: June 30, 2000－November 25, 2002
Bai Keming: November 25, 2002－August 31, 2007
Zhang Yunchuan: August 31, 2007－August 28, 2011
Zhang Qingli: August 28, 2011－March 20, 2013
Zhou Benshun: March 20, 2013－July 24, 2015
Zhao Kezhi: July 31, 2015－October 28, 2017
Wang Dongfeng: October 28, 2017－April 22, 2022
Ni Yuefeng: April 22, 2022-present

Governors of Hebei
Yang Xiufeng: August 8, 1949－November 15, 1952
Lin Tie: November 15, 1952－April 16, 1958 
Liu Zihou: April 16, 1958－January 19, 1967
Li Xuefeng: February 3, 1968－January 24, 1971
Liu Zihou: January 24, 1971－December 26, 1979
Li Erzhong: February 6, 1980－June 16, 1982
Liu Bingyan: August 10, 1982－April 28, 1983
Zhang Shuguang: April 28, 1983－May 4, 1986
Xie Feng: May 4, 1986－May 3, 1988
Yue Qifeng: May 3, 1988－June 15, 1990
Cheng Weigao: June 15, 1990－May 21, 1993
Ye Liansong: May 21, 1993－November 6, 1999
Niu Maosheng: November 6, 1999－December 21, 2002
Ji Yunshi: December 21, 2002－October 31, 2006
Guo Gengmao: October 31, 2006－April 15, 2008
Hu Chunhua: April 15, 2008－December 15, 2009
Chen Quanguo: December 15, 2009－August 24, 2011
Zhang Qingwei: August 24, 2011－April 7, 2017
Xu Qin: April 7, 2017－October 21, 2021
Wang Zhengpu(): October 21, 2021－present

Chairmen of Hebei People's Congress 
Jiang Yizhen: February 6, 1980－April 28, 1983
Liu Bingyan: April 28, 1983－June 26, 1985
Sun Guozhi: June 26, 1985－May 7, 1988
Guo Zhi: May 7, 1988－May 18, 1993
Lu Chuanzan: May 18, 1993－January 18, 1998
Cheng Weigao: January 18, 1998－January 10, 2003
Bai Keming: January 18, 2003－January 28, 2008
Zhang Yunchuan: January 28, 2008－November 26, 2011
Zhang Qingli: January 10, 2012－January 12, 2014
Zhou Benshun: January 12, 2014－October 16, 2015
Zhao Kezhi: January 12, 2016－December 1, 2017
Wang Dongfeng: January 29, 2018－ April 22, 2022
Ni Yuefeng: April 22, 2022- present

Chairmen of the CPPCC Hebei Committee 
Ma Guorui: January 19, 1955－October 11, 1964
Yan Dakai: October 11, 1964－December 3, 1977
Liu Zihou: December 3, 1977－February 7, 1980
Yin Zhe: February 2, 1980－April 4，1988
Li Wenshan: April 4, 1988－January 13, 1998
Lu Chuanzan: January 13, 1998－January 15, 2003
Zhao Jinduo: January 15, 2003－January 26, 2008
Liu Dewang: January 26, 2008－January 9, 2012
Fu Zhifang: January 9, 2012－January 28, 2018
Ye Dongsong: January 28, 2018－present

 
Hebei
Hebei